Roger Hollett (born October 8, 1978) is a retired Canadian mixed martial artist who formerly fought for the Ultimate Fighting Championship in their Light Heavyweight division. He is the former Maximum Fighting Championship Light Heavyweight Champion.

Biography
Roger was born and raised in Fairview, Nova Scotia. He is the son of Canadian former boxing and kickboxing champion, Ralph Hollett, in which Roger was practiced in the disciplines of boxing and kickboxing while growing up with his father. He trains at the Titans Gym in Halifax and holds a brown belt in Brazilian Jiu-Jitsu under Kevin Taylor and Peter Martell, both being Renzo Gracie black belts. He also trains with, and is managed by Muay Thai instructor, and Muay Thai champion, Robert Walker.

Mixed martial arts career

Early career

Hollett was sidelined temporarily due to torn ligaments in his left knee (ACL, MCL, and meniscus) during a takedown attempt by Lew Polley in their October 20, 2007 match, which Hollett lost via TKO, snapping his 7 fight winning streak.

Hollett made an impressive comeback at ECC 8: Comeback on September 20, 2009, defeating Marcus Hicks via TKO at 1:35 of round 1.

Following his fight with Hicks, Hollett returned to the Maximum Fighting Championship at MFC 19 on December 5, 2008 against Emanuel Newton in a bout for the vacant MFC Light Heavyweight Championship. Newton won the fight via unanimous decision and claimed the title. While Hollett threw harder strikes than his opponent, Newton was able to control Hollett throughout the fight with takedowns, low kicks, and jabs. This would mark Hollet's first time going to a decision.

Hollett lost his second straight fight to UFC veteran David Heath at MFC 20 on February 20, 2009, by submission due to a guillotine choke in the first round.

Hollett returned to action on September 26, 2009 at ECC 10: Demolition by overwhelming fellow Canadian Chris Peak in the first round via kimura, snapping his two fight losing streak.

Hollett's next fight came at the Maximum Fighting Championship's HeatXC 4: Hysteria on November 6, 2009 in Edmonton, Alberta, Canada in which he defeated Aron Lofton via armbar at 3:02 of round 1.

Roger returned to the cage after sustaining yet another injury, on October 23, 2010 at W-1 MMA 6: New Ground in Halifax, NS, facing Mychal Clark. Roger dominated Clark en route to a unanimous decision victory.

In January 2011, it was announced that Roger was scheduled to face Steve Bossé in Montreal, Quebec, Canada at Ringside MMA 10: Cote vs. Starnes. However, Bosse was forced out of the fight due to an injury. Canadian up and comer, and reigning TFC Light Heavyweight Champion, Martin Desilets was brought in as a late replacement. Roger defeated Desilets via TKO at 1:39 of round 2.

Hollett was expected to face MMA legend Jeremy Horn at ECC 14: Warrior's Soul on April 27, 2012. However, the fight was cancelled when Hollet failed his medical tests.

Bellator Fighting Championships
Hollett next defeated John Hawk via split decision at Bellator 57 to gain a spot in the Season 7 Light-Heavyweight Tournament. However, due to an injury, he was unable to compete in the tournament and was released from the promotion shortly after.

Ultimate Fighting Championship
On August 3, 2012 it was announced that Hollett had signed a UFC contract.

Hollett was expected to make his promotional debut against Matt Hamill on September 22, 2012 at UFC 152 in Toronto, Ontario, Canada. However, Hollett was forced out of the bout due to a contract dispute with Bellator and replaced by Vladimir Matyushenko. On September 11, 2012, it was announced that Hollett would fight Hamill after all after Matyushenko had to pull out of the fight due to a torn Achilles tendon. Hollett lost the fight via unanimous decision.

Hollett was expected to face Wagner Prado on January 19, 2013 at UFC on FX 7. However, Hollett was forced out of the bout with a torn bicep and was replaced by promotional newcomer Ildemar Alcantara.

Hollett had his second UFC fight against Fábio Maldonado on May 18, 2013 at UFC on FX 8. He lost the fight via unanimous decision and was subsequently released from the promotion.

Championships and accomplishments
Maximum Fighting Championship
MFC Light Heavyweight Championship (One time)

Mixed martial arts record

|-
| Loss
| align=center| 13–5
| Fábio Maldonado
| Decision (unanimous)
| UFC on FX: Belfort vs. Rockhold
| 
| align=center| 3
| align=center| 5:00
| Jaraguá do Sul, Brazil
| 
|-
| Loss
| align=center| 13–4
| Matt Hamill
| Decision (unanimous)
| UFC 152
| 
| align=center| 3
| align=center| 5:00
| Toronto, Ontario, Canada
| 
|-
| Win
| align=center| 13–3
| John Hawk
| Decision (split)
| Bellator 57
| 
| align=center| 3
| align=center| 5:00
| Rama, Ontario, Canada
| 
|-
| Win
| align=center| 12–3
| Martin Desilets
| TKO (punches)
| Ringside MMA 10: Cote vs. Starnes
| 
| align=center| 2
| align=center| 1:39
| Montreal, Quebec, Canada
| 
|-
| Win
| align=center| 11–3
| Mychal Clark
| Decision (unanimous)
| W-1 New Ground
| 
| align=center| 3
| align=center| 5:00
| Halifax, Nova Scotia, Canada
| 
|-
| Win
| align=center| 10–3
| Aron Lofton
| Submission (armbar)
| HeatXC 4: Hysteria
| 
| align=center| 1
| align=center| 3:02
| Edmonton, Alberta, Canada
| 
|-
| Win
| align=center| 9–3
| Chris Peak
| Submission (kimura)
| ECC 10: Demolition
| 
| align=center| 1
| align=center| 1:45
| Halifax, Nova Scotia, Canada
| 
|-
| Loss
| align=center| 8–3
| David Heath
| Submission (guillotine choke)
| MFC 20
| 
| align=center| 1
| align=center| 1:58
| Edmonton, Alberta, Canada
| 
|-
| Loss
| align=center| 8–2
| Emanuel Newton
| Decision (unanimous)
| MFC 19: Long Time Coming
| 
| align=center| 5
| align=center| 5:00
| Edmonton, Alberta, Canada
| 
|-
| Win
| align=center| 8–1
| Marcus Hicks
| TKO (punches)
| ECC 8: Comeback
| 
| align=center| 1
| align=center| 1:35
| Halifax, Nova Scotia, Canada
| 
|-
| Loss
| align=center| 7–1
| Lew Polley
| TKO (punches)
| ECC 6: Hometown Heroes
| 
| align=center| 1
| align=center| 4:02
| Halifax, Nova Scotia, Canada
| 
|-
| Win
| align=center| 7–0
| Victor Valimaki
| TKO (submission to strikes)
| MFC 13: Lucky 13
| 
| align=center| 1
| align=center| 2:06
| Edmonton, Alberta, Canada
| 
|-
| Win
| align=center| 6–0
| Shane Biever
| KO (punches)
| MFC 12: High Stakes
| 
| align=center| 1
| align=center| 0:15
| Edmonton, Alberta, Canada
| 
|-
| Win
| align=center| 5–0
| Ricardeau Francois
| TKO (submission to punches)
| ECC 5: A Night of Champions
| 
| align=center| 1
| align=center| 0:20
| Halifax, Nova Scotia, Canada
| 
|-
| Win
| align=center| 4–0
| Mike Maurer
| KO (punches)
| MFC 11: Gridiron
| 
| align=center| 1
| align=center| 0:36
| Edmonton, Alberta, Canada
| 
|-
| Win
| align=center| 3–0
| Pay Penny
| Submission (rear-naked choke)
| ECC 4: Fury
| 
| align=center| 1
| align=center| 2:37
| Halifax, Nova Scotia, Canada
| 
|-
| Win
| align=center| 2–0
| Jason Cecil
| Submission (keylock)
| ECC 3: East Coast Warriors
| 
| align=center| 1
| align=center| 1:41
| Halifax, Nova Scotia, Canada
| 
|-
| Win
| align=center| 1–0
| Peter Rogers
| Submission (armbar)
| ECC 1: The Beginning
| 
| align=center| 1
| align=center| 3:50
| Halifax, Nova Scotia, Canada
|

See also
 List of male mixed martial artists
 List of Canadian UFC fighters

References

External links
 Official site
 
 

1978 births
Living people
Canadian male mixed martial artists
Light heavyweight mixed martial artists
Mixed martial artists utilizing boxing
Mixed martial artists utilizing Muay Thai
Sportspeople from Halifax, Nova Scotia
Ultimate Fighting Championship male fighters
Canadian Muay Thai practitioners
Canadian practitioners of Brazilian jiu-jitsu